Baba Yara (real name Osman Seidu)  was a Ghanaian international football player. He was popularly known as the ''King of Wingers''.

He started his career as a horse jockey player as a youngster at the Accra Turf Club from 1950 to 1955.

He was a former player of Kumasi Asante Kotoko in Ghana. He was signed by Asante Kotoko in 1955.

He made his debut as a player of the Ghana Black Stars in 1955. He was part of Ghana National team that won African Cup of Nations in 1963. He played for Ghana in their unsuccessful 1962 FIFA World Cup qualification campaign. He is regarded as one of the best Ghanaian wingers of all time.

At the age of 26, he was injured in a motor collision at Kpeve in the Volta region while travelling back to Accra with his team, Real Republicans. His team played against Volta Heroes of Kpandu and won on the 24th of March 1963. He suffered a spinal injury and was paralysed and never played again.

He was flown to England accompanied by a surgical specialist from 37 Military Hospital by the name Dr. R. O. Addae where he was to be treated at Stoke Mandeville Hospital for spinal injuries. Reports received from the hospital stated there was likely Yara will gain recovery within a period of 4–6 months. It did not happen and he returned home on 14 August 1963 in a wheelchair. He died on 5 May 1969 at Korle-Bu Teaching Hospital.

In 2005, the Baba Yara Stadium was named in his honour.

Honours 
Footballer of the Year

Distinguished Member of the Black Star Group: 1961

References 

1936 births
1969 deaths
Ghana international footballers
Asante Kotoko S.C. players
Ghanaian Muslims
Ghanaian footballers
Association football midfielders